Auguste Georges Paul Grignard (25 July 1905 in Villeneuve-Saint-Georges – 7 December 1977 in Port-Marly) was a racing driver from France.  He raced in Formula One from 1947 to 1953, participating in one World Championship Grand Prix on 28 October 1951. He also participated in numerous non-Championship races, including winning the 1950 Paris Grand Prix.

Complete Formula One World Championship results
(key)

References 
Georges Grignard profile at Grand Prix encyclopedia

1905 births
1977 deaths
Sportspeople from Villeneuve-Saint-Georges
French racing drivers
French Formula One drivers
24 Hours of Le Mans drivers
World Sportscar Championship drivers